Maaten is a Dutch surname. Notable people with the surname include:

Jules Maaten (born 1961), Dutch politician
Kenneth Maaten (born 1953), Canadian modern pentathlete

See also
Jacob Jan van der Maaten (1820–1879), Dutch painter and etcher